American rock band the All-American Rejects have released four studio albums, 22 singles, 21 music videos, 4 video albums, and 7 extended plays.

The All-American Rejects formed in 1999, releasing their debut self-titled album through Doghouse Records in October 2002. The album was later reissued by DreamWorks Records in 2003, along with their first single "Swing, Swing". The All-American Rejects was certified platinum by the RIAA after reaching number nine on Billboard's Top Independent Albums chart and number 25 on the Billboard 200. "Swing, Swing" peaked at No. 60 on the Billboard Hot 100, No. 8 on the Hot Modern Rock Tracks chart, and No. 13 in the United Kingdom Singles chart.

In 2005, the All-American Rejects released their second album, Move Along, which placed at number six on the Billboard 200. The album was certified two times platinum by the RIAA, featuring three successful singles: "Dirty Little Secret", "Move Along", and "It Ends Tonight". The singles all peaked in the top 15 of the Billboard Hot 100 and Pop 100 charts, with "Dirty Little Secret" receiving a triple platinum certification from the RIAA.

In 2008, the All-American Rejects released "Gives You Hell", bringing their best chart performance in the Billboard Hot 100 and now defunct-Pop 100, at number four and two respectively. Later in 2008, the band released their third album, When the World Comes Down, which debuted at number 15 on the Billboard 200 and was later certified RIAA gold. Both the single and album experienced success in Australia and New Zealand in February 2009, with "Gives You Hell" peaking at No. 3 on the ARIA Singles Chart and When the World Comes Down peaking at No. 19 on the RIANZ Albums Chart. Another single, "I Wanna", was also a hit in Australia and was certified Gold by the ARIA.

The band's fourth studio album, Kids in the Street, was released March 26, 2012, with its lead single, "Beekeeper's Daughter", peaking at No. 24 on the Bubbling Under Hot 100 Singles chart. Two further singles followed—"Kids in the Street" and "Heartbeat Slowing Down"—but both failed to chart. Their 2017 single, "Sweat", became the group's first entry on the Hot Rock Songs chart.

Studio albums

Extended plays

Notes: † Does not have an official name.

Singles

Promotional singles

Videography

Video albums

Music videos

Other appearances

Notes

References

General
 
 
 
Specific

External links
Allamericanrejects.com Official website

The All-American Rejects at MusicBrainz

Discographies of American artists
Pop punk group discographies